George V Bridge or King George V Bridge may refer to a number of different bridges named after the British king:
Keadby Bridge across the River Trent in Lincolnshire, England
George V Bridge, Glasgow, across the River Cylde in the centre of Glasgow, Scotland
George V Bridge, Orléans, across the Loire in Orléans